Marmaria may refer to several places in Greece:

Marmaria, Arcadia, a village in the municipal unit of Valtetsi, Arcadia
Marmaria, Astypalaia, a settlement in the island of Astypalaia, in the Dodecanese
Marmaria, Drama a village in the municipal unit of Nikiforos, Drama regional unit